Rear Admiral Charles Henry Poor (June 11, 1808 – November 5, 1882) was a U.S. Navy officer of the mid-19th century.

Born in Cambridge, Massachusetts, in 1808, Poor entered the Navy in 1825 and served nearly 30 years at sea. He was promoted to rear admiral in 1868 and commanded the North Atlantic Squadron. Poor retired in 1870 from that post.

Poor married Mattie Lindsay Stark, daughter of Dr. Robert B. Stark. His daughters Elizabeth Lindsey Poor and Annie Cunnigham Poor married rear admiral Theodore Frelinghuysen Jewell (on June 15, 1871) and philanthropist Charles Carroll Glover, respectively. Poor died on November 5, 1882, in Washington, D.C. He was interred at Oak Hill Cemetery in Washington, D.C.

Dates of rank
 Midshipman, 1 March 1825
 Passed midshipman, 4 June 1831
 Lieutenant, 22 December 1835
 Commander, 14 September 1855
 Captain, 16 July 1862
 Commodore, 2 January 1863
 Rear admiral, 20 September 1868

References

1808 births
1882 deaths
Union Navy officers
United States Navy admirals
People from Cambridge, Massachusetts
People from Washington, D.C.
People of Massachusetts in the American Civil War
Burials at Oak Hill Cemetery (Washington, D.C.)